Benua may refer to:
 5419 Benua, an asteroid
 Benua (protist), a Peronosporaceae oomycete